The Yokohama Silk Museum is a museum located in Naka-ku, Yokohama, Japan that covers the silk trade in Japan. The museum displays silk kimono and covers the importance of Yokohama as a silk port.

The objective of the museum is, according to their website:

To disseminate an understanding of the science and technology of silk production, display beautiful costumes for people to admire and promote the demand for silk.

References

External links 

Silk Museum

Museums in Yokohama
Naka-ku, Yokohama
Textile museums in Japan
Silk